"The Doll-House" is a short story by Hugh Jones Parry, under the name "James Cross". It was first published in Harlan Ellison's 1967 science fiction anthology Dangerous Visions.

Synopsis
When Jim Eliot is in financial trouble, he asks for help from his wife's uncle, who gives him a dollhouse containing a miniature oracle. Due to his lack of patience he loses this oracle in the end.

Development 
Per Algis Budrys, the short story was one of two stories that was "simply submitted by the authors ' literary agent when Harlan got desperate for material".

Reception
Ted Gioia described "The Doll-House" as "a very appealing mixture of ancient mythology and modern psychodrama". Algis Budrys said that it was a Weird Tales-style story, only published in Dangerous Visions because "Harlan got desperate for material".

The manuscript for "The Doll-House" is held in the Hugh Parry collection at Boston University.

References

External links 

1967 short stories
Science fiction short stories
Dangerous Visions short stories